Colin Addison (born 18 May 1940) is an English former professional footballer and manager.

Born in Taunton, Somerset, Addison started his playing career with York City before moving to Nottingham Forest, Arsenal and Sheffield United. His managerial career started when he took the post of player-manager of Hereford United in 1971 during their famous 1971–72 FA Cup run, which saw them defeat Newcastle United.

Since then Addison has managed a wide variety of clubs in the UK, as well as in Spain, South Africa, Kuwait and Qatar.

Playing career
Addison was born in Taunton but brought up in York. He joined York City as an amateur and turned professional in May 1957.

In his second season, he scored 10 league goals helped York win promotion to the recently created Third Division, and midway through the 1960–61 season he was transferred to First Division side Nottingham Forest for £12,000, a then-record fee for City.

Addison was a regular at the City Ground scoring 62 goals in 160 league appearances, before being signed by Bertie Mee's Arsenal in 1966 for £45,000. His time at Highbury was hampered by injury and, after scoring an average of 1 goal in every 3 games for the Gunners, he was sold to First Division side Sheffield United at the end of the 1967 season.

Addison joined United on the recommendation of assistant manager Andy Beattie who he had played with whilst at Nottingham Forest, signing for £40,000. Signed as a centre forward and provide goals, he remained a first-team regular until the 1971 season where, when he opted to move into management, joining leading non-league side Hereford United as player-manager.

Managerial career

Player-Manager
Addison arrived at Hereford United in October 1971, succeeding the legendary John Charles as player-manager. He inherited a strong group of players which he led through the club's famous Giantkilling FA Cup run and ultimately election to the Football League.

In the Second Round, Addison and his team needed two replays to get past Northampton Town but it was worth the effort as a trip to top-flight Newcastle United awaited. After going 2–1 down in the tie, it was Addison who hit the 25-yard equaliser to take the Magpies to the return fixture at Edgar Street.

In front of a capacity crowd and on a quagmire of a pitch, Addison and Hereford unbelievably won 2–1 after extra time with Radford and George scoring. They went on to take West Ham United to another replay in the Fourth Round before eventually losing 3–1 at Boleyn Ground.

Hereford were elected to the Football League at the end of Addison's first season as a manager, and the success continued the following season when Hereford finished as runners-up in Division Four.

Management at the Touchline 
Addison carried on playing until November 1973, but with a broken leg, he proceeded as manager until 1974 when he left to manage South African side Durban City F.C. To mark his achievements at Hereford, an area north of the Edgar Street football ground was named Addison Court in his honour.

He returned to England in December 1975, joining Notts County as assistant to Ronnie Fenton. His next managerial position was at Newport County achieving the 'Great Escape' of the 1976-77 season before he returned to West Bromwich Albion as assistant manager to Ron Atkinson.

After two seasons in charge at Derby County Addison departed in 1982, returning to Newport County where he led the team to their highest post-war league finish in the 1982–83 season. In May 1985 Addison left the Welsh side, moving to Qatar to guide Al-Ahli to second position in the Qatari league. Subsequently, Addison took the reins in Spain, where he took Celta Vigo into 'La Liga' First Division in his first season in charge.

A second spell at West Bromwich Albion as assistant manager to Ron Atkinson followed, before he and Ron departed for Atlético Madrid in October 1988. However, Atkinson left Los Colchoneros after only two months, with Addison taking over the leadership of the club. Addison departed Atlético Madrid leaving the capital's side 5th in La Liga First Division, moving to Cádiz CF where he garnered a string of victories to ensure Cadiz's position in La Liga First Division. Addison then moved to Kuwait where he won the league with Al-Arabi, finishing above second-placed team managed by Felipe Scolari. Returning to the UK, Addison once again took up the reins at Hereford United.

Further management callings in the UK followed, with a succession of clubs including Yeovil Town, Swansea City and Conference National side Forest Green Rovers, leading the club to what was their highest ever league finish, at the time. He was manager of Scarborough in the 1998-99 season, when goalkeeper Jimmy Glass scored an astonishing and memorable goal for Carlisle United, which changed the course of the season in the dying minutes, subsequently relegating Scarborough.

Personal life
Addison currently resides in the city of Hereford, and was a pundit on BBC Radio Wales until 2008.

He has operated as commentator and pundit on Spanish Football for Sky Sports, and as experienced FA Cup player and manager, as commentator and pundit for ESPN.

Addison acts as commentator and football advisor across the UK and Europe.

He also consults for clubs and media entities in Spain, USA and Asia.

Honours

Manager
Individual
 Football Conference Manager of the Month:February 2003

References

External links

1940 births
Living people
Sportspeople from Taunton
Footballers from York
English footballers
Association football forwards
English Football League players
English football managers
English expatriate football managers
York City F.C. players
Nottingham Forest F.C. players
Arsenal F.C. players
Sheffield United F.C. players
Hereford United F.C. players
Hereford United F.C. managers
Newport County A.F.C. managers
Derby County F.C. managers
La Liga managers
CD Badajoz managers
Cádiz CF managers
RC Celta de Vigo managers
Atlético Madrid managers
Scarborough F.C. managers
Yeovil Town F.C. managers
Swansea City A.F.C. managers
Al Ahli SC (Doha) managers
Forest Green Rovers F.C. managers
Merthyr Tydfil F.C. managers
Expatriate footballers in Spain
Expatriate football managers in Spain
English expatriate sportspeople in Spain
Barry Town United F.C. managers
Cymru Premier managers
English expatriate sportspeople in South Africa
Expatriate soccer managers in South Africa
Durban City F.C. managers
English expatriate sportspeople in Qatar
Expatriate football managers in Qatar
English expatriate sportspeople in Kuwait
Expatriate football managers in Kuwait
Kuwait Premier League managers
Al-Arabi SC (Kuwait) managers